Boston, Massachusetts has an extensive park and open space network that is managed by several agencies including the city's Department of Parks and Recreation. Parks cover about 17% of the city's area, and all residents are within a 10-minute walk of a park. Boston has 930 parks, according to The Trust for Public Land's ParkScore.

By neighborhood

Allston-Brighton 

 Brighton Common
 Cassidy Playground (Walter F. Cassidy Playground)
 Fidelis Way Park

Beacon Hill 

 Louisberg Square
 Phillips Street Park
 Temple Street Park

Charlestown 

 Galvin Memorial Park
 Winthrop Square

Downtown / Back Bay 

 Back Bay Fens
Boston Common
 Boston Public Garden
Clarendon Street Playlot
Frieda Garcia Children's Park
Jenney Plaza
Norman B. Leventhal Park/Post Office Square
Rose Kennedy Greenway
Rowes Wharf Plaza
Union Street Park

Dorchester 

 Dorchester Shores Reservation
 Franklin Park

East Boston 

 American Legion Playground
Bremen Street Park
 East Boston Memorial Park
Golden Stairs Terrace Park
 LoPresti Park
McLean Playground
 Piers Park
Putnam Square Park

Fenway/Kenmore 

 Commonwealth Avenue Mall
Edgerly Road Playground
Forsyth Park
Ramler Park

Harbor Islands 

 Spectacle Island

Jamaica Plain 

 Anson Street Garden
Arcola Street Community Park
Arnold Arboretum
Brewer-Burroughs Playground
English High School Ball Fields
Forbes Street Playground
Forest Hills Station Mall Park
Forest Hills Preserve
Hall/Boynton Street Garden
Jamaica Pond
Jefferson Playground
Johnson Park
Lawndale Terrace Garden Park
McBride Garden
Mozart Street Playground
Murphy Field & Playground
Nira Rock Urban Wild
Nira Avenue Garden
Olmsted Park
Paul Gore Beecher Street Community Garden
Parkman Memorial Park
Rossmore and Stedman Street Park
South Street Courts and Mall
South Street Community Garden
Southwest Corridor Park
Train Park

Mission Hill 

 Back of the Hill Urban Wild
Butterfly Garden
Evans Way Park
 Iroquois Woods
 Kevin W. Fitzgerald Park
Lawn Street Garden
McLaughlin Playground
Mission Hill Community Garden
Mission Hill Playground
 Parker Hilltop/McLaughlin Woodlands
Tobin Community Center Garden

Roslindale 

 Roslindale Wetlands Urban Wild Park

South Boston 

 Carson Beach
 Castle Island

West Roxbury 

 Millennium Park

References

External links 
 Popular Playgrounds and Parks In Boston City of Boston website

Boston
Parks in Boston